Vyttila, is an intersection as well as the name of a region in the city of Kochi, in the state of Kerala, India. It is the busiest as well as one of the largest intersections in Kerala. This node intersects the main north–south artery of the state of Kerala, namely, the Kochi Bypass, with three city roads of Kochi viz, the S. A. Road (One of the city's most prominent arterial road in the east–west direction), the Vyttila-Petta Road, and the Thammanam Road.

The name Vyttila  is said to be evolved from the word "Vayal Thala" meaning the main part of the paddy field. Once the area including Elamkulam, were paddy fields and paddy cultivation were the main sources of income. The paddy field existed from Ernakulam, Girinagar, Panampilly Nagar, Gandhi Nagar, Jawahar Nagar, Kumarananshan Nagar and extended to Kaniyampuzha and Panamkutyy bridge. Some also say that because there existed a bunch of dacoits, who murdered and looted the travelers the name evolved from 'Vazhithala'. Once the Puthenpalam bridge that connected Chilavennoor Lake and Chettichira was the only link from Vayalthala with Ernakulam.

Vyttila hosts the Vyttilla Mobility Hub, which converges different ways of surface transport (namely, local as well as long-distance buses, rail, Metro Rail and inland water transport) to the city onto a single node.
 
Vyttila is also the name of the region in the city of Kochi, of which the Vyttila Intersection is a part. Until 1967, Vyttila was a panchayat. The November 1967 order of the Kerala Legislative Assembly amalgamated Vyttila to the newly formed Kochi Corporation.

Chalikavattom
Chalikavattom placed in nearby vytila around 1 km

Vyttila Mobility Hub

Vyttila is home for the Vyttila Mobility Hub, which converges different modes of surface transport (namely, local as well as long-distance buses, rail, Metro Rail and inland water transport) to the city of Kochi onto a single node. Phase-1 of the project consists of a Bus Terminal with 13 bus bays, each of which can park 5 buses. Thus, when Phase-1 is completed, the terminal can handle as many as 65 buses at a time. Part of the proposed Phase-1 was commissioned on 26 February 2011. well before completion of the phase, owing to a political decision to inaugurate the terminal before declaration of the State Election which is anticipated on 1 March 2011. What was so far was commissioned consists of 4 of the proposed 13 bus bays. 3 more bus bays are presently under construction. The mobility hub is located north-east of the Vyttila Intersection, in the area between Kaniyampuzha Road and Poonithura Village Office. Vyttila is the node of the city that connects it to the neighbouring districts viz, Thrissur, Alappuzha, Kottayam and Idukki.

Kochi Bypass

The Aroor-Edapally streatch of the National Highway 66, even though built a couple of decades back, as a highway, to by-pass the city of Kochi, has now become a busy city road, necessitating the construction of a newer by-pass, a little more eastward to the city (which is already proposed in the Kochi Master Plan).

The Vytilla Junction on the bypass is the biggest and busiest road intersection in the state. It connects the district headquarters of Kottayam, Alleppey etc. to the Kochi city centre.

Major Organizations 

Vyttila is home to hospitals like the Welcare Hospital and the Mother & Child Hospital. The State Bank of India, State Bank of Travancore, Punjab National Bank, Corporation Bank, Vijaya Bank, Bank of Baroda, Federal Bank, South Indian Bank all have branches in this area. Toc H Public School, St. Rita's H.S Ponnurunni, C.K.C.L.P.S are schools located in Vyttila. There are several supermarkets (prominent among them include V-Mart and the Margin Free Market chain of mini-super markets) in this area in addition to several mom & pop stores and pharmacies. Eateries like K.R Bakes, Aryaas, Best Bakers, Delight Bakers and traditional 'Thattukadas' are also decent hangouts for people across age groups in the junction.

Schools
Vyttila hosts the following schools:
Toc H Public School
 C.K.C Girls High School, Ponnurunni
 St. Rita's High School, Ponnurunni
Nalanda Public School Thammanam

Foreign language colleges
Traum Academy for German & French languages
menon

Places of worship
 Sree Narayaneshwaram Temple, Ponnurunni
 Kavalampillil Neelingattu Bagavathy Temple
 Vytilla Siva Subramonia Temple
 Ayyampillikavu Devi Temple
 Kavalampilly Dharma Daiva Temple, Junior Janatha Road
 St. Patrick's Church, Vyttila
 St. Raphael's Church, Thykkodam
 St. Gregorios Orthodox Syrian Church, Shine Road, Vyttila
 Our Lady of Health Church, Chalikkavattom
 St. Joseph's Shrine, Major Road
 Sharon Fellowship Church, Opp. K.S.E.B Off., Vyttila. 
 Sharon Fellowship Church, Thykoodam. .
 Ignatious Noorono Jacobite Church, Ponnurunni
 Chalikavattom Juma Masjid
 Juma Masjid Eroor
 Salafi Masjid, Vyttila

Shopping and entertainment

The Kundannoor-Edapally stretch of the Kochi Bypass passing through Vyttila is a center for shopping. The junction has the outlet of Unlimited within 200 metres from the junction towards Cherthala. There are several supermarkets (prominent among them include Bismi Hypermart, Big Mart and the Margin Free Market) in this area in addition to several mom & pop stores and pharmacies. Eateries like KFC, Subway, McDonald's, Dominos, Hotel Anugraha, K.R Bakes, Hotel Aryaas, Best Bakers, Delight Bakers, Rasam Restaurant, Naalukettu, Shaapp Food, Salt & Pepper Cafe and traditional 'Thattukadas' or cornerstore eateries are also decent hangouts for people across age groups in the junction. The Oberon Mall, another multiplex mall in Kochi with its cinemax theatres, is also situated along the way from Vyttila to Edappally.

Adjacent regions 

Janatha, Power-house, Thykoodam, Kaniampuzha, and Ponnurunni are all located in close proximity to Vyttila. Vyttila is now more of a commercial location. However the area surrounding the junction are still thickly populated.

The roads and lanes on either side of S.A. Road and the NH are filled with residential buildings. There are residents associations for each area in Vyttila. The Vyttila Residents Welfare Association is prominent among them. The association which is based at Maplachery Road, covers the entire south-west area from Vyttila junction with Maplachery Road and Bank Road as its borders.

Business

Vyttila has many business headquarters. Few of them are:
Tulsi Developers India Pvt Ltd.
Skyline Builders,
NEST (software),
SMS Builders,
the Ernakulam District Co-operative Bank, and
Shwas Homes.

References

External links

http://www.kerala.gov.in//ernaks/agri.htm Kerala Govt. Official website - Agri Dept page, with address of Agri Office at Vyttila
https://web.archive.org/web/20090814235404/http://www.tochschool.com/secmenudisp.php?MID=62 Toch Public School (Vyttila) website - school's location page with route map from Vyttila junction
https://web.archive.org/web/20110202195045/http://vytilla.com/
http://www.india9.com/i9show/Vytilla-68972.htm
The Hindu: Mobility hub at Vytilla proposed
http://article.wn.com/view/2010/01/22/Decks_cleared_for_Vytilla_bus_terminal/
The Hindu: Vytilla hub in public interest
http://www.keraladaily.net/index.php?mod=article&cat=keralanews&article=941

Neighbourhoods in Kochi